Ralph Bean may refer to:

Ralph Bean (footballer) (born 1980), Bermudian international footballer
Ralph J. Bean (1912–1978), American politician